Chris Aloisi (born February 21, 1981) is an American retired soccer player and coach.

Career

College
Aloisi played four years of college soccer at Syracuse University, where he was named to the All-Big East third-team twice.

Professional
Aloisi was drafted 57th overall in the 2004 MLS SuperDraft by Los Angeles Galaxy. He struggled to get much playing time in a deep 2004 Galaxy defense, and was traded to the San Jose Earthquakes in the off-season in a four-player deal. Along with the rest of his Earthquakes teammates, he moved to Houston to play for the new Houston Dynamo for the 2006 season. Following that season, Aloisi and the team decided to part ways, having never made a first team appearance for Houston.

For the 2007 Season, Aloisi returned to his home state to play for the Rochester Raging Rhinos in the USL First Division. Aloisi took the rightback spot vacated by the departing Frank Sanfilippo, and eventually played in 19 games for the team, before leaving to take a player/assistant coach role with the Long Island Rough Riders in the USL Premier Development League.

Honors

Houston Dynamo
Major League Soccer MLS Cup (1): 2006

References

1981 births
Living people
People from North Babylon, New York
Soccer players from New York (state)
LA Galaxy players
San Jose Earthquakes players
Houston Dynamo FC players
USL First Division players
Rochester New York FC players
Long Island Rough Riders players
Syracuse Orange men's soccer players
USL League Two players
Major League Soccer players
LA Galaxy draft picks
Association football defenders
American soccer players
USL League Two coaches
Adelphi Panthers men's soccer coaches